The India cricket team toured New Zealand in the 1980–81 season to play a three-match Test series and a two-match One Day International (ODI) series against New Zealand. The tour also included two tour matches against New Zealand's first-class sides. After the tour ended, India played Fiji in a two-day game in Lautoka, defeating them by 220 runs. New Zealand won the ODI series 2–0 and the Test series that followed 1–0. It was their first series win against India in Tests in seven attempts.

India arrived in New Zealand on the back of a series-levelling win in the final Test against Australia. However, failing to capitalize on the momentum, India lost both ODIs played on consecutive days, before drawing a game against a first-class side. India missed the services of Shivlal Yadav for the entire Test series that followed, and of Dilip Doshi for the first Test after they sustained injuries on the Australia tour. New Zealand defeated India by 62 runs in the first Test, their first win against India in seven Tests, while India managed to secure draws in the next two. Wisden reasoned India's "inept batting" for their loss of the series.

Tour matches

Three-day: Central Districts v Indians

Three-day: Otago v Indians

ODI series

1st ODI

2nd ODI

This series was the first where players wore coloured clothing played with white balls and black sighscreens used outside Australia

Test series

1st Test

2nd Test

3rd Test

References

External links
 Tour home at ESPN Cricinfo
 Tour Directory at ESPN Cricinfo archives
 

1981 in Indian cricket
1981 in New Zealand cricket
1980-81
International cricket competitions from 1980–81 to 1985
New Zealand cricket seasons from 1970–71 to 1999–2000